The Gippsland Trophy is a new addition to the WTA Tour in 2021.

Barbora Krejčíková and Kateřina Siniaková won the title, defeating Chan Hao-ching and Latisha Chan in the final, 6–3, 7–6(7–4).

Seeds

Draw

Finals

Top half

Bottom half

References

 Main Draw

2021 WTA Tour
2021 Gippsland Trophy – Doubles